Chytrolestes is a genus of hymenopteran insects of the family Eulophidae.

References
 Key to Nearctic eulophid genera 
 Universal Chalcidoidea Database 

Eulophidae